Ian Foster (born 1981) is a Canadian singer-songwriter, producer and filmmaker, based in St. John's, Newfoundland and Labrador.

A multi-MusicNL and ECMA nominated artist, Foster has toured his modern folk/roots songs internationally since 2007.

Foster has produced albums for various artists including Kat McLevey ('Evergrown,' 2014) and Melanie O'Brien ('Shining in the Blue,' 2016). 'Evergrown' subsequently won two MusicNL Awards and received an ECMA nomination, and 'Shining in the Blue' was nominated for two MusicNL Awards in 2017.

Foster's latest film, Keystone, debuted at the 2015 Calgary International Film Festival, and was named one of their 'top 10 short films of the year.'

He composed the soundtrack to the award-winning documentary Hand.Line.Cod.

Discography

References

External links
Ian Foster Official Website

Living people
1981 births
Musicians from St. John's, Newfoundland and Labrador
Canadian folk musicians
Canadian singer-songwriters
Film directors from Newfoundland and Labrador
Canadian record producers